Flower Town was an unincorporated community located in Pendleton County, Kentucky, United States.

References

Unincorporated communities in Pendleton County, Kentucky
Unincorporated communities in Kentucky